The 2013 Pan American Men's Club Handball Championship took place in Taubaté from 19 to 23 June. It acts as the Pan American qualifying tournament for the 2013 IHF Super Globe.

Teams

 Club Atlético River Plate
 SAG Villa Ballester
 Santiago Steels
 EC Pinheiros
 Metodista
 Handebol Taubaté
 Universidad Americana
 German School of Montevideo

Modus 
The seven teams played in two groups a round Robin.

The two last from each group played the 5-8 place semifinals.

The loser of this played the 7 place game and the winners the 5th place game.

The first from each group played against the second from the other group the Semifinals.

The losers of the semis played Third place game and the winners the Final.

Round robin

Group A

Group B

Championship

Semifinals

Small Final

Final

Placement Games

5th–8th Semifinals

7th place game

5th place game

Final standing

Awards

Top scorers

All-Star Team

References

External links
PATHF Official tournament website

Pan American Men's Club Handball Championship
2013 in handball
2013 in Brazilian sport
Pan American